Dr. Walter P. Witherspoon, better known as Buddy Witherspoon, served as the National Executive Committeeman of the South Carolina Republican Party from 1996 to 2008.  In that capacity, he served as a voting member of the Republican National Committee.

In 2008, he started an exploratory committee to challenge incumbent U.S. Senator Lindsey Graham in the Republican Party primary for the 2008 South Carolina Senate Race. On June 10, 2008, he lost by more than a 2–1 margin.

External links
 Buddy Witherspoon's official campaign website

Year of birth missing (living people)
Living people
People from Columbia, South Carolina
South Carolina Republicans
2004 United States presidential electors
2000 United States presidential electors